St. Mary's Higher Secondary School is a private Catholic primary and secondary school for boys located in Dindigul, Tamil Nadu, India. The school was founded by the Jesuits in 1850.

About the school
St. Mary's occupies a large area in the heart of Dindigul, five minutes from the bus stand. The Hostel is just opposite the school gate. The environment of the school includes green, spacious grounds and multiple sports fields. The school contains numerous houses: Main Building or Clock House (built in the British period), Jubilee Hall Block, Central Stage with staff rooms, offices, and library, and Fathers House. In 2010 an Engineering Class Block was added.

Besides sports, extracurriculars include drama, handwriting competition, poetry, music, NSS, NCC and NCC (Airwing), JRC, Scouting, and National Green Secretaries for Students.

Branches

Admission to 6th and 9th Standard is by Entrance Exam.

St. Mary's Higher Secondary School provides four branches for class XI & XII: Computer Science, Biology (with maths and physics), Accounting & Commerce, and Vocational Group (EMR, Textile, EDA, Sports).

Generally all students of St. Mary's School pass the X (SSLC) exam. What branch they continue in depends on their marks in this exam. Classes XI and XII have room for additional students but the earlier classes are filled mainly by Christians and by the poor, since it was for them that the school was founded.

See also

 List of Jesuit schools
 List of schools in Tamil Nadu

References

External links 
  Saint Mary's Higher Secondary School, Dindigul at Facebook

Jesuit primary schools in India
Jesuit secondary schools in India
Christian schools in Tamil Nadu
High schools and secondary schools in Tamil Nadu
Education in Dindigul district
Dindigul
Educational institutions established in 1850
1850 establishments in India
Boys' schools in India